Mohamed Elias Achouri (born 10 February 1999) is a professional footballer who plays as a forward for Danish Superliga side Viborg FF. Born in France, Achouri plays for the Tunisia national team.

Club career
On 26 August 2021, Achouri joined Liga Portugal 2 club Trofense on loan from Estoril. On 31 August 2022, Achouri joined Danish Superliga side Viborg FF on a deal until June 2025.

International career
Achouri was born in Saint-Denis, Seine-Saint-Denis to a Tunisian father and an Algerian mother. He debuted for the Tunisia national team in a 4–0 UEFA Nations League win over Equatorial Guinea on 2 June 2022.

Career statistics

Club

References

1999 births
Living people
Tunisian footballers
French footballers
Tunisian expatriate footballers
French expatriate footballers
Tunisia international footballers
Tunisian people of Algerian descent
French sportspeople of Tunisian descent
French sportspeople of Algerian descent
Sportspeople from Saint-Denis, Seine-Saint-Denis
Association football forwards
Vitória S.C. B players
G.D. Estoril Praia players
C.D. Trofense players
Viborg FF players
Liga Portugal 2 players
Campeonato de Portugal (league) players
Danish Superliga players
Tunisian expatriate sportspeople in Portugal
French expatriate sportspeople in Portugal
French expatriate sportspeople in Denmark
Expatriate footballers in Portugal
Footballers from Seine-Saint-Denis